The  is a 6.9 km railway line in northern Osaka Prefecture, Japan, operated by the private railway company Keihan Electric Railway. It connects Hirakatashi Station on the Keihan Main Line with Kisaichi Station.

Operation
All trains stop at all stations, except as noted below. There is no through service to Keihan Main Line.

Until 15 March 2013, several trains through to Keihan Main Line were operated on weekdays, as rapid trains. They were named "Hikoboshi" and "Orihime", unlike other Keihan line rapid trains which were not named.

Operated weekday mornings, from Kisaichi for Nakanoshima, stopped at all stations on the Katano Line to Hirakatashi, then Kōrien, Neyagawashi, Kyōbashi and Temmabashi on the Keihan Main Line, then Naniwabashi, Ōebashi and Watanabebashi on the Nakanoshima Line

Stations
All stations are in Osaka Prefecture.

Rolling stock
Trains on the line are formed as 4- or 5-car electric multiple unit (EMU) sets.
 10000 series 4-car EMUs
 13000 series 4-car EMUs (since 9 June 2012)

Former
 1900 series 5-car EMUs
 2600 series 4-car EMUs

History
The line was built and opened by an independent railway company,  in 1929. The company aimed to build a line to connect its main line, the present-day Ikoma Line, but cancelled the plan for financial reasons, and transferred the operation to Keihan. The operator was renamed  in 1939,  in May 1945, and Keihan Electric Railway on 1 December 1949.

From 9 June 2012, new 13000 series 4-car EMUs were introduced on the line.

References

Katano Line
Rail transport in Osaka Prefecture
Standard gauge railways in Japan
Railway lines opened in 1929